Nižný Hrušov is a village and municipality in Vranov nad Topľou District in the Prešov Region of eastern Slovakia.

History
In historical records the village was first mentioned in 1254.

Geography
The municipality lies at an altitude of 130 metres and covers an area of 18.47 km². It has a population of about 1,665 people.

References

External links
 
 

Villages and municipalities in Vranov nad Topľou District
Zemplín (region)